Dexter Fletcher (born 31 January 1966) is an English film director and actor. He has appeared in Guy Ritchie's Lock, Stock and Two Smoking Barrels, as well as in television shows such as the comedy drama Hotel Babylon and the HBO series Band of Brothers and, earlier in his career, starred as Spike Thomson in the comedy drama Press Gang. His earliest acting role was playing Baby Face in the 1976 film Bugsy Malone. 

Fletcher made his directorial debut with Wild Bill  (2011), and also directed Sunshine on Leith (2013) and Eddie the Eagle (2015). He replaced Bryan Singer as director of Bohemian Rhapsody, a biopic about the band Queen, released in October 2018; due to DGA rules, he received executive producer credit. In 2019, he directed Rocketman, a biographical film based on the life and music of performer Elton John.

Career
Fletcher trained at the Anna Scher Theatre. His first film part was as Baby Face in Bugsy Malone (1976). He made his stage début the following year in a production of A Midsummer Night's Dream. As a youth actor he was regularly featured in British productions in the early 1980s, including The Long Good Friday, The Elephant Man and The Bounty. In 1987 Fletcher was cast in Lionheart. As an adult he appeared on television as the rebellious teenager Spike Thomson in Press Gang and in Murder Most Horrid (1991) with Dawn French. He has also starred in the films Caravaggio (1986), The Rachel Papers (1989), Lock, Stock and Two Smoking Barrels (1998), Layer Cake (2004), AffirmFilm's Solomon as Rehoboam and Universal's Doom.

On television Fletcher has appeared in the major HBO drama, Band of Brothers and in a supporting role in the BBC One historical drama The Virgin Queen (US PBS 2005, UK 2006). He also appeared in Kylie Minogue's music video for "Some Kind of Bliss" (1997). He starred on BBC One in a series based on Imogen Edwards-Jones's book Hotel Babylon that ran for four series before being cancelled in 2009. He also appeared in "The Booby and the Beast", an episode in the second series of the BBC's series Robin Hood and in the 2008 radio series The Way We Live Right Now. He appeared in the Bo' Selecta! spinoff A Bear's Tail as The Scriptwriter. He played a brief role in the BBC series New Tricks, in the episode "Final Curtain", as an actor named Tommy Jackson.
In 2009, he also appeared in Misfits as Nathan Young's dad, reprising the role in 2010 for the second series. 

Fletcher has been the voice for McDonald's television adverts and (feigning a US accent) is the narrator of The Game audio book written by Neil Strauss. He also narrated the Five series Airforce Afghanistan, as well as the Chop Shop: London Garage series on the Discovery Channel. In 1993, he was the voice of Prince Cinders in the short animated comedy of the same name. Also in 1993, he was the uncredited UNIT soldier narrator of the UNIT Recruiting Film – a five-minute spoof piece that preceded a BBC1 repeat of the sixth and final episode of Doctor Who story Planet of the Daleks. In 2014 he narrated the BBC1 show Del Boys and Dealers. In 1998, Fletcher featured on the song "Here Comes the Flood" from the album Fin de Siecle by The Divine Comedy.

Directing
Fletcher's debut as a director for a script he co-wrote, Wild Bill, which was released on 20 March 2012. His second film as director is a musical film by Stephen Greenhorn, Sunshine on Leith based around the popular Proclaimers songs which were released on 4 October 2013. In 2015, he directed the feature film Eddie the Eagle. On 6 December 2017, Fletcher was announced as Bryan Singer's replacement director on the Queen biopic, Bohemian Rhapsody. The film was released on 2 November 2018. While Fletcher had helped finish the film, Singer received sole directing credit and he received executive producer credit. Fletcher directed the 2019 biopic Rocketman, about the life of Elton John. In February 2020, he signed on to direct a reboot of The Saint for Paramount Pictures.

Personal life
Fletcher was born in Enfield, the youngest of three boys, in North London, and grew up with his brothers in Woodford Green and Palmers Green; his parents were teachers. 

In 1997 he married Lithuanian film and theatre director Dalia Ibelhauptaitė in Westminster. His best man was fellow actor Alan Rickman. Dexter's brothers were also actors; Graham Fletcher-Cook and Steve Fletcher. Fletcher is a dual British and Lithuanian citizen, having been granted Lithuanian citizenship in recognition of his work promoting Lithuanian cultural affairs.

Theft from Buster Edwards 
On 15 June 1991, Fletcher was running along Mepham Street in London, when he scooped up two bunches of nasturtiums valued at £5 from a flower stall belonging to the Great Train Robber, Buster Edwards. Edwards declined to chase Fletcher for fear of leaving his stall unattended. Fletcher was seen to run onto York Road. Edwards reported the theft to the police, identifying his assailant as being "that lad out of The Rachel Papers". Fletcher's timing was unlucky because Edwards had seen the film for the first time only days before. Fletcher was arrested and charged with theft.

The following week, Fletcher appeared at Horseferry Road Magistrates' Court and pleaded guilty. He was given a conditional discharge for twelve months and ordered to pay £30 costs. In mitigation, Fletcher said that the flowers were for his girlfriend and Press Gang co-star Julia Sawalha, but that he had lost his cash card and was therefore unable to obtain funds. Fletcher subsequently apologised to and compensated Edwards.

Filmography

Filmmaking credits

Acting credits

References

Bibliography
 Holmstrom, John. The Moving Picture Boy: An International Encyclopaedia from 1895 to 1995. Norwich, Michael Russell, 1996, pp. 358–360.

External links

 
 Interview with Dexter Fletcher

1966 births
English male film actors
English film producers
English film directors
English male television actors
Lithuanian male film actors
Lithuanian film producers
Lithuanian film directors
Lithuanian male television actors
Living people
Alumni of the Anna Scher Theatre School
People from Enfield, London
Male actors from London